The Gotha WD.11 (for Wasser Doppeldecker - "Water Biplane") was a torpedo bomber seaplane developed in Germany during World War I. When the general configuration of the Gotha WD.7 proved promising, Gotha set to work designing a much larger and more powerful aircraft along the same general lines. Like its predecessor, it was a conventional biplane with twin engines mounted tractor-fashion on the lower wing. The pilot and observer sat in tandem, open cockpits and the landing gear consisted of twin pontoons. 12 examples were built for the Imperial German Navy.

Operators

Kaiserliche Marine

Royal Netherlands Navy

Specifications (WD.11)

References

Bibliography

Further reading

 
 

1910s German bomber aircraft
Floatplanes
WD.11
Biplanes
Twin piston-engined tractor aircraft
Aircraft first flown in 1916